The Parrocel family was a French family of painters, including

Georges Parrocel (c. 1540, Montbrison - c. 1614, Montbrison)
 (c. 1595, Montbrison - 1658 or 1660, Brignoles), brother of Georges
Jean Barthélemy Parrocel (1631–1667), son of Barthélemy
 (1634–1703), son of Barthélemy
Joseph Parrocel (1646–1704), son of Barthélemy
Pierre Parrocel (1670, Avignon - 1739, Paris), son of Louis
 (1667, Avignon - 1722, Mons), son of Louis and brother of Pierre
Étienne Parrocel (1696–1775)
Charles Parrocel (1688–1752), battle painter, youngest son of Joseph
Joseph-Ignace Parrocel (1704–1781)
Joseph-François Parrocel (1704, Avignon - 1781, Paris), son of Pierre